Nubia Muñoz (born 1940) is a Colombian medical scientist and epidemiologist, whose research has been instrumental in establishing that  human papillomavirus (HPV) infection is the primary cause of cervical cancer which has led to the development of a vaccine that is capable of preventing 70% of all cervical cancers.

Biography 

Her father, a farm worker in Cali died of diphtheria when she was six years old. She would be the only one of her siblings to go to university when she was accepted into the medical school at Universidad del Valle, specializing in Pathology. After graduating, she completed a fellowship at the National Cancer Institute in Bethesda, Maryland, USA with an emphasis in pathology and virology. She then earned a Master's Degree in Public Health (Cancer Epidemiology) from Johns Hopkins University in Baltimore, Maryland, USA.    

In 1969, she joined the International Agency for Research on Cancer (IARC) headquarters in Lyon, France, where she researched cancers formed due to pathogens. In the 1980s, she led her own unit at the IARC, where she studied the link between  HPV and cervical cancer. In 1995, she was instrumental in the IARC's decision to classify HPVs 16 and 18 as group 1 human carcinogens.

She retired from the IARC in 2001, but continues to work at the Catalan Institute of Oncology in Barcelona and the National Cancer Institute in Bogota where she is Emeritus Professor.

Recognition and Awards 
Honorary Degree, Doctor of Science (D.Sc.), McGill University

International Agency for Research on Cancer Medal of Honor

Canada Gairdner Global Health Award

Charles Rodolphe Brupbacher Prize for Cancer Research

2008 International Epidemiological Association's Richard Doll Prize

2018 Frontiers of Knowledge Award, Development Cooperation category

Rumored to have been nominated for the Nobel Prize in Physiology and Medicine in 2008

References 

Living people
Women epidemiologists
Cancer researchers
1940 births
Colombian women biologists
People from Cali
Johns Hopkins Bloomberg School of Public Health alumni
Colombian expatriates in the United States